Turbe is a settlement in the Travnik municipality, Federation of Bosnia and Herzegovina, Bosnia and Herzegovina. The name is derived from Turkish türbe.

Population

See also
Enes Mameledžija
Travnik

References

Villages in the Federation of Bosnia and Herzegovina
Populated places in Travnik